Marilou Awiakta (born January 24, 1936 in Knoxville, Tennessee) is a poet whose perspective fuses her Cherokee, Scots-Irish, and Appalachian heritage with experiences of growing up in Oak Ridge, Tennessee, on the atomic frontier. 
She is internationally known for her poetry and cultural essays.

Biography and career 
Marilou Awiakta is the seventh generation of her family to grow up in Appalachia, mostly in East Tennessee. Since 1730, her family has lived in the mountainous area of the state.

Awiakta graduated from the University of Tennessee in 1958 receiving a B.A. magna cum laude, in both English and French. She worked as a civilian liaison officer and translator for the U.S. Air Force at Laon-Couvron Air Base, France from 1964-1967 where her husband, Dr. Paul Thompson, was based.

She lives in Memphis, Tennessee, where she has worked in the Arts-In-Schools program and formed poetry workshops in the Women's Prison.  She was co-founder of the Far Away Cherokee Association which is now the Native American Intertribal Association.
She has conducted many programs and writers' workshops nationwide, including Tennessee, Virginia, West Virginia, Georgia, Alaska, Massachusetts, Kentucky, New York, and California.

In July 2014, editors in France featured her work in www.recoursaupoeme.fr

Awards
Distinguished Tennessee Writer Award, 1989 
Appalachian Heritage Writer's Award, Shepherd College, 2000 
Named one of Tennessee's Ten Significant Women for USA TODAY"S celebration of 100 Years of Women's Suffrage, August 17, 2020 Knoxville News Sentinel front page

Books
Abiding Appalachia: Where Mountain and Atom Meet. Memphis: Saint Luke's Press, 1978. Rpt. Bell Buckle, TN: Iris Press, 1995. 71 pp. Rpt. 2006 Pocahontas Press, 65 pp. $14.95 illustrated with Afterword by Parks Lanier, Jr. Now available from Aleex Thompson Conner, Marketing Dimensions, 1528 Britling Drive, Knoxville, TN 37922,  telephone 865-691-6083. Poetry that weaves together Cherokee history, the legend of Little Deer, memories of growing up in Oak Ridge (where the atom was split in the 1940s), and thoughts on family, society, and the land.Rising Fawn and the Fire Mystery: A Child's Christmas in Memphis, 1833. Memphis: Saint Luke's Press, 1983.Selu: Seeking the Corn-Mother's Wisdom. Golden, CO: Fulcrum, 1993. A blend of story, essay, and poetry. Cherokee legends and images from the double weave of Cherokee baskets point us toward preserving a nurturing relationship between humanity and Mother Earth, by instilling appreciation for the earth and applying Native American philosophies to modern problems.

Analysis
Awiakta's poetry is analysed at length in Our Fire Survives the Storm'' by Daniel Heath Justice (Cherokee Nation).

References

See also
 List of Native American writers
 Poetry

American people of Cherokee descent
American people who self-identify as being of Native American descent
1936 births
Living people
People from Knoxville, Tennessee
20th-century American women writers
21st-century American women writers
20th-century American poets
21st-century American poets
American women poets
Poets from Tennessee
University of Tennessee alumni
American expatriates in France